These are the official results of the men's 3000 metres steeplechase event at the 1972 Summer Olympics in Munich. The competition was held on 1 and 4 September.

Heats
The top three runners in each of the four heats (blue), advanced to the final round.

Heat one

Heat two

Heat three

Heat four

Final

References

External links
Official report

Men's 3000 metres steeplechase
Steeplechase at the Olympics
Men's events at the 1972 Summer Olympics